This is a list of flag bearers who have represented Turkey at the Paralympics

References

Flag bearers
Paralympics Flag bearers
Turkey